Diploscapteridae is a family of nematodes belonging to the order Rhabditida.

Genera:
 Carinoscapter Siddiqi, 1998

References

Nematodes